Events from the year 1979 in Canada.

Incumbents

Crown 
 Monarch – Elizabeth II

Federal government 
 Governor General – Jules Léger (until January 22) then Edward Schreyer
 Prime Minister – Pierre Trudeau (until June 4) then Joe Clark
 Chief Justice of Canada – Bora Laskin (Ontario)
 Parliament – 30th (until 26 March) then 31st (11 June–14 December)

Provincial governments

Lieutenant governors 
Lieutenant Governor of Alberta – Ralph Steinhauer (until October 18) then Francis Charles Lynch-Staunton  
Lieutenant Governor of British Columbia – Henry Pybus Bell-Irving 
Lieutenant Governor of Manitoba – Francis Lawrence Jobin 
Lieutenant Governor of New Brunswick – Hédard Robichaud
Lieutenant Governor of Newfoundland – Gordon Arnaud Winter 
Lieutenant Governor of Nova Scotia – John Elvin Shaffner 
Lieutenant Governor of Ontario – Pauline Mills McGibbon
Lieutenant Governor of Prince Edward Island – Gordon Lockhart Bennett 
Lieutenant Governor of Quebec – Jean-Pierre Côté
Lieutenant Governor of Saskatchewan – Irwin McIntosh

Premiers 
Premier of Alberta – Peter Lougheed  
Premier of British Columbia – Bill Bennett 
Premier of Manitoba – Sterling Lyon 
Premier of New Brunswick – Richard Hatfield
Premier of Newfoundland – Frank Moores (until March 26) then Brian Peckford 
Premier of Nova Scotia – John Buchanan 
Premier of Ontario – Bill Davis 
Premier of Prince Edward Island – Bennett Campbell (until May 3) then Angus MacLean
Premier of Quebec – René Lévesque
Premier of Saskatchewan – Allan Blakeney

Territorial governments

Commissioners 
 Commissioner of Yukon –  Frank Fingland (interim) (until January 20) then Ione Christensen (January 29 to October 6) then Douglas Bell
 Commissioner of Northwest Territories – Stuart Milton Hodgson (until April 15) then John Havelock Parker

Premiers 
Premier of Yukon – Chris Pearson

Events

January to June
January 17 - Edward Richard Schreyer replaces  Jules Léger as Governor General
February 1 - The first Winterlude is held in Ottawa
February 24 - An explosion rips through Number 26 Colliery located in Glace Bay, Cape Breton killing 12 men.
February 26 a total solar eclipse take place in the USA And Canada 
March 14 - Alberta election: Peter Lougheed's PCs win a third consecutive majority
March 26 - Brian Peckford becomes premier of Newfoundland, replacing Frank Moores
May 3 - Angus MacLean becomes premier of Prince Edward Island, replacing Bennett Campbell
May 22 - Canadians go to the polls in the federal election.  They defeat Pierre Trudeau's Liberals and elect Joe Clark's PCs, but only with a minority
June 4 
Joe Clark becomes Canada's sixteenth, and youngest ever, prime minister.
Flora MacDonald becomes Canada's first female Secretary of State for External Affairs.
June 7 - The Sudbury Strike of 1978 ends after nine months.

July to December
September 5 - Canada's first gold bullion coin goes on sale
November 10 - The 1979 Mississauga train derailment causes the evacuation of hundreds of thousands of people
December 13 - Supreme Court declares Quebec and Manitoba's provincial legislatures to be unconstitutional because of their use of only one language.
December 13 - The government is defeated on a non-confidence motion and Prime Minister Clark calls an election
December 31 - A fire at Le Club Opemiska in Chapais, Quebec, kills 48 at a New Year's Eve party.

Full date unknown
Chris Haney and Scott Abbott invent Trivial Pursuit
Petro-Canada buys U.S.-controlled Pacific Petroleums
The first women enroll in Canadian military colleges
Founding of Academy of Canadian Cinema

Arts and literature

New works
Irving Layton: The Tightrope Dancer
Margaret Atwood: Life Before Man
Steve McCaffery: Intimate Distortions
Roch Carrier: Les enfants du bonhomme dans la lune
Joy Fielding: Trance
Gabrielle Roy: Courte-Queue
Gordon R. Dickson: The Spirit of Dorsai
Farley Mowat: And No Birds Sang

Awards
Antonine Maillet wins the French  Prix Goncourt for her novel Pélagie-la-Charette
See 1979 Governor General's Awards for a complete list of winners and finalists for those awards.
Stephen Leacock Award - Sondra Gotlieb, True Confessions
Vicky Metcalf Award - Cliff Faulknor

Television
Lorne Michaels starts Broadway Video, a company that would go on to produce shows like The Kids in the Hall and Saturday Night Live
You Can't Do That On Television premiers

Sport
March 18 – The Alberta Golden Bears win their fifth (second consecutive) University Cup by defeating the Dalhousie Tigers 5–1 in Montreal 
May 13 – The Peterborough Petes win their only Memorial Cup by defeating the Brandon Wheat Kings 2 to 1. The final game was played at Palais des Sports in Sherbrooke, Quebec
May 21 – The Montreal Canadiens win their 22nd (fourth consecutive) Stanley Cup by defeating the New York Rangers 4 games to 1. The deciding Game 5 was played at the Montreal Forum. Peterborough, Ontario's Bob Gainey was awarded the Conn Smythe Trophy
June 22 – The World Hockey Association folds.  Four teamsthe Edmonton Oilers, Winnipeg Jets, Quebec Nordiques and Hartford Whalerssurvive and move to the NHL.
September 1 – Pat Patterson wins the first  World Wrestling Federation Intercontinental Champion  
September 8 – The Vancouver Whitecaps win their only Soccer Bowl by defeating the Tampa Bay Rowdies 2–1 at  Soccer Bowl '79 played Giants Stadium in East Rutherford, New Jersey
November 17 – The Acadia Axemen win their first Vanier Cup by defeating the Western Ontario Mustangs 34–12 in the 15th Vanier Cup played at Varsity Stadium in Toronto
November 25 – The Edmonton Eskimos win their sixth (second consecutive) Grey Cup by defeating the Montreal Alouettes by the score 17 to 9 in the 67th Grey Cup played at Olympic Stadium at Montreal. Vancouver's Don Sweet is awarded his third Most Valuable Canadian award

Births

January to June
January 8 - Sarah Polley, actress, singer, film director and screenwriter
January 9 - Jenny Johnson, field hockey player
January 14 - Nick Boynton, ice hockey player
January 24 -  Tom Kostopoulos, ice hockey player
February 8 - Adam Trupish, boxer
February 11 - Eric Cyr, baseball player
February 15 - Ohenewa Akuffo, freestyle wrestler
February 21 - Andre Noble, actor (d. 2004)
February 22 
 Patrick Merrill, lacrosse player
 Jeremy Wilcox, volleyball player
February 23 – Maryke Hendrikse, voice actress
March 15 - Azelia Liu, field hockey player
April 4 - Roberto Luongo, ice hockey player
April 17 - Eric Brewer, ice hockey player
May 9 - Pierre Bouvier, singer
May 10 - Dion Lavhey, Montreal Canadiens player
May 11 - Erin Lang, singer-songwriter and guitarist
June 1 - Craig Olejnik, actor
June 3 - Pierre Poilievre, politician
June 5 - Pete Wentz, musician
June 24 - Fanny Létourneau, synchronized swimmer
June 27 - Rebecca Jane Middleton, murder victim (d. 1996)

July to December
July 2 - Joe Thornton, ice hockey player
July 4 - Mark Twitchell, filmmaker and murderer
July 7 - Shane Yellowbird, musician (d. 2022)
July 16 - Nathan Rogers, singer-songwriter
August 3 - Evangeline Lilly, actress
August 9 - Erin Chan, synchronized swimmer
August 22 - Jennifer Finnigan, actress
August 31 - Mark Johnston, swimmer
September 15
 Patrick Marleau, ice hockey player
 Brett Youngberg, volleyball player
September 21 - Nathaniel Miller, water polo player
October 7 - Aaron Ashmore, actor
October 7 - Shawn Ashmore, actor
October 13 - Ryan Malcolm, singer (Low Level Flight) and winner of Canadian Idol
November 14 - Randee Hermus, soccer player
November 21 - Alex Tanguay, ice hockey player
December 3 - Rainbow Sun Francks, actor and singer
December 6 - Maxime Collin, child actor
December 10 - Andrea Rushton, field hockey player
December 27 - Pascale Dorcelus, weightlifter

Deaths
February 23 - W. A. C. Bennett, Premier of British Columbia (b. 1900)
March 26 - Lionel Bertrand, politician, journalist and newspaper editor (b. 1906)
May 9 - Cyrus S. Eaton, investment banker, businessman and philanthropist (b. 1883)
May 15 - Dora Mavor Moore, actor, teacher and director (b. 1888)
May 29 - Mary Pickford, actress and studio co-founder (b. 1892)
July 11 - Claude Wagner, judge and politician (b. 1925)
August 16 - John Diefenbaker, politician and 13th Prime Minister of Canada (b. 1895)
September 28 - John Herbert Chapman, scientist and space researcher (b. 1921)
November 24 - John Robert Cartwright, jurist and Chief Justice of Canada (b. 1895)
December 19 - Donald Creighton, historian (b. 1902)

See also
 1979 in Canadian television
 List of Canadian films of 1979

References

 
Years of the 20th century in Canada
Canada
1979 in North America